The Minister for Housing is a cabinet minister within the Swedish Government and appointed by the Prime Minister of Sweden.

The minister is responsible for issues regarding housing and constructing new houses and apartments. The current minister for housing is Andreas Carlson, appointed on 18 October 2022.

Between 1974 and 1991, there was a ministry called the Ministry of Housing. The minister for housing was the head of the Ministry of Housing. In 1991, the ministry was dissolved and the position was abolished. In 1994, the position was reinstated and a cabinet minister was given the responsibility for housing issues. Since 1994, there has always been a cabinet minister with responsibility for housing issues. Ministers for housing have all worked in different ministries. ”” means Councillor of State with responsibility for issues regarding housing'.

List of officeholders

Footnotes

References

Ministries established in 1974
Government ministries of Sweden
Swedish Ministers for Housing